Bùi Dzinh (born 1929) is a former Vietnamese military commander.

Early life
Bùi Dzinh was born in the village of Xuân Hoá in the Lệ Thủy district of Vietnam's Quảng Bình Province. He was educated at the Vietnamese National Military Academy in Đà Lạt, graduating as valedictorian in 1951. He was then assigned to 21 Battalion. After attending a staff officer training course at the École Militaire in Paris, he served in the First Military Zone P.3 under Colonel Lê Văn Nghiêm.

Vietnam War service
By the outbreak of the Vietnam War in 1955, he was commander of the Quảng Ngãi subregion of Quảng Nam Province. He continued to serve in the Army of the Republic of Vietnam, and was assigned as commander of various divisions in areas ranging from Buôn Ma Thuột in the Central Highlands to Biên Hòa, outside of Saigon.

Dismissal from service

In 1963, following the military coup by Dương Văn Minh, Bùi Dzinh was dismissed from service. Despite this, he continued to collaborate with his former superiors, Lâm Văn Phát and Phạm Ngọc Thảo in the organisation of several coup attempts against the then military leader Nguyễn Khánh on 19 February 1965. For his involvement, Bui Dzinh was pursued and arrested in May 1965 near Saigon. He was found guilty on two counts, membership in the attempted coup and the use of illegal force, and was sentenced to life imprisonment in the Chí Hòa Prison. He remained there until his release on 1 July 1967 by order of the President's Committee.

After North Vietnam captured Saigon in 1975 and won the Vietnam War, where he was placed in a labour camp along with most other South Vietnamese government and military officials, serving from 1976 to 1980. He was released, but Journey by sea border to refugee camps in Thailand on 1981.

References

1929 births
Possibly living people
People from Quảng Bình province
Vietnamese exiles
Recipients of the National Order of Vietnam